Wickham is an extinct unincorporated community in Hampshire County in the U.S. state of West Virginia. It originally developed as a stop on the South Branch Valley Railroad in the Trough. Wickham is located within a gap in Mill Creek Mountain on the South Branch Potomac River. One white clapboard structure remains of the community.

References

Unincorporated communities in Hampshire County, West Virginia
Populated places on the South Branch Potomac River
Unincorporated communities in West Virginia
South Branch Valley Railroad